Michael Howard (April 23, 1923 – November 29, 2019) was an American actor, theatre director, and master teacher. He founded Michael Howard Studios in New York City. Howard was married to Betty Bartelt, who predeceased him in 2016, aged 97. He died in Brooklyn, New York in November 2019 at the age of 96.

References

External links
Michael Howard Studio Website
An Actor's Guide
WOR News Talk Radio - Community Concerns 11.17.08
Taped Lecture @ Michael Howard Studios 07.08

1923 births
2019 deaths
United States Army personnel of World War II
American male film actors
Drama teachers
United States Army soldiers